Kayla De Souza (born 7 March 1990) is a footballer who plays for North Mississauga SC. Born in Canada, she represented the Guyana national team.

University career
De Souza turned down scholarship opportunities to play in the United States for personal reasons. In 2013, he began attending Ontario Tech University, playing for the women's soccer team for two season. In 2014, she was an OUA All-Star and won an OUA bronze medal, as the Ridgebacks advanced to the U SPORTS championship for the first time in program history. She scored five goals in 28 games over her two seasons.

Club career
From 2015 to 2019, she played for Durham United FA in League1 Ontario, during which she served as team captain. In 2015, she scored one goal and was named League1 Ontario Defender of the Year and a league First Team All-Star, as Durham won the league title. In 2016, she played 16 games and was a league Second Team All-Star. In 2017 she played 11 games, in 2018, she played five games, and in 2019, she appeared in ten games. She scored a goal on May 13, 2017 against West Ottawa SC.

In 2021, she played for Vaughan Azzurri.

In 2022, she played for North Mississauga SC.

International career
De Souza debuted with the Guyana national team in 2009. She serves as the team's captain.

International goals
Scores and results list Guyana's goal tally first

Personal life
De Souza is of Guyanese heritage on her father's side and Italian heritage on her mother's side. She is the sister of fellow Guyana national team player Briana De Souza.

See also
List of Guyana women's international footballers

References

External links 
 

1990 births
Living people
Citizens of Guyana through descent
Guyanese women's footballers
Women's association football midfielders
Guyana women's international footballers
Sportspeople from Scarborough, Toronto
Soccer players from Toronto
Canadian women's soccer players
Guyanese people of Italian descent
Canadian sportspeople of Guyanese descent
Canadian people of Italian descent
Vaughan Azzurri (women) players
Pickering FC (women) players
League1 Ontario (women) players
North Mississauga SC (women) players